Mt. Pleasant Winery Historic District is a historic winery and national historic district located at Augusta, St. Charles County, Missouri. The district encompasses a frame half-timber house (c. 1859) with brick outbuilding (c. 1880); a brick winery building (1881) with a stone well house (1881); and wine cellars (c. 1865).  The winery building measures approximately 24 feet by 62 feet, 6 inches, with a 15 foot by 17 foot extension leading to the wine cellars.  The wine cellars feature brick floors and brick barrel vaults supported by stone walls.

It was added to the National Register of Historic Places in 1995.

References

External links
Mt. Pleasant Winery

Wineries in Missouri
Historic districts on the National Register of Historic Places in Missouri
Houses completed in 1859
Industrial buildings completed in 1881
Buildings and structures in St. Charles County, Missouri
National Register of Historic Places in St. Charles County, Missouri
1859 establishments in Missouri